Akhilesh Das Gupta (31 March 1961 – 12 April 2017) was an educationist, professor, Indian politician and philanthropist. He was the son of Freedom Fighter Babu Banarasi Das, former Chief Minister of Uttar Pradesh.
He was the president of Badminton Association of India, vice president of Badminton Asia Confederation, member – Executive Council of Badminton World Federation, and vice president of Indian Olympic Association.

Early life and education

Akhilesh Das Gupta (born on 31 March 1961) had done schooling at Colvin Taluqdars College, Lucknow, Diploma in Public Administration, LL.B., MBA & PhD (Management). He had been a National Level Badminton Player and had represented the state of Uttar Pradesh (U.P.) from 1977 to 1983. He had also represented the country in various International Badminton Tournaments.

Professional life

Akhilesh Das Gupta was a noted Educationist and a Social Welfare Activist. He had served as Founder Chancellor of Babu Banarasi Das University, Lucknow in the year 1998.
He was the Chairman of Babu Banarasi Das Educational Institutions that provide education to over 30,000 students every year in the fields of Management, Engineering, Dental Sciences, Pharmacy, Law, Architecture and Social Sciences in Lucknow & Delhi. 
He was Mayor of Lucknow (Uttar Pradesh) from May 1993– Nov 1996 and contributed extensively in the development of the city. 
He had held country's most prestigious office as 'Member of Parliament'(Rajya Sabha) for 18 years serving three consecutive terms of 6 years each from November 1996 to November 2014.
He had held the office of the Minister for Steel from January 2006 till May 2008 under Dr. Manmohan Singh Government during UPA-I. 
He had actively served as secretary of Congress Parliamentary Party between 2003 and 2006 when Sonia Gandhi was heading Congress.
He had served as chairman of the Organizational Election Authority for Congress in Tamil Nadu and Pondicherry, and successfully conducted the grass-roots level organizational elections of the Party in the year 2004–05.
In Uttar Pradesh, he had served as :
Jt. secretary, general secretary and vice president of the UP Congress Committee, and also chairman, Uttar Pradesh Traders' Cell of the UP Congress
He had been the chairman of the Standing Committee of Parliament on Industries.
He had been the national general secretary of the Bahujan Samaj Party from the year 2008 to 2014.

Fraud Allegations

Akhilesh Das Gupta, along with other higher officials of the Badminton Association of India were accused of fraud and nepotism, by favoring their own children for a goodwill trip to Japan, and were investigated by the CBI. The Japanese Government had sponsored a Badminton tournament in Tokyo as a means of promoting Japanese culture and values amongst Asian youth. The criteria for selection was that players be between 17 and 23 years and that they should have played at the regional or state level in that country.

According to the CBI, Akhilesh Das Gupta, along with other top officials such as Jitender Kochar DCBA general secretary, Harish Ahuja DCBA vice-president, Apinder Sabharwal former secretary of DCBA, Kamal Kumar Thapar former treasurer of DCBA and Harish Mittal former member, connived and had their own kin and wards posing as badminton players to be short-listed for the trip. No advertisement was published or any trial conducted for genuine badminton players. The CBI had completed the investigation and sent its report to the Sports Ministry, Government of India, but no action had been taken thus far.

Death

Akhilesh Das Gupta died from a heart attack on 12 April 2017 in the early morning at his residence.

Extra-curricular activities

Akhilesh Das Gupta presently had held many crucial portfolios on sports on the National and International fronts :
President, Badminton Association of India (BAI)
Chairman, Premier Badminton League (PBL)
President, Uttar Pradesh Olympic Association (UPOA)
Vice President, Indian Olympic Association (IOA)
Vice President, Badminton Asia Confederation (BAC)
Executive Council, Badminton World Federation (BWF)

References

1961 births
2017 deaths
Heads of universities and colleges in India
Indian philanthropists
Indian National Congress politicians from Uttar Pradesh
Mayors of Lucknow
Rajya Sabha members from Uttar Pradesh
Bahujan Samaj Party politicians from Uttar Pradesh
Indian male badminton players
Colvin Taluqdars' College alumni